The Institute of Mathematics of the Polish Academy of Sciences is a research institute of the Polish Academy of Sciences.

About the Institute
The institute is located at 8 Śniadeckich Street in Warsaw.  It was established on November 20, 1948 as the National Mathematical Institute and in the same year the Mathematical Devices Group (Pol: Grupę Aparatów Matematycznych) was established there, and this can be considered the beginning of computer science in Poland. In 1952 it was incorporated into the structures of the Polish Academy of Sciences. The institute conducts doctoral studies in the field of mathematics.

Branches
It is a national institution and, in addition to the headquarters in Warsaw, there are six branches in other Polish cities.
 Warsaw: director - prof. dr hab. Łukasz Stettner
 Gdańsk: head - prof. dr hab. Tomasz Szarek
 Katowice: head - prof. dr hab. Ryszard Rudnicki
 Krakow: head - dr hab. Michał Kapustka
 Poznań: titular professors: Jerzy Kaczorowski
 Toruń: titular professors: Tomasz Rychlik and Piotr Śniady
 Wrocław: head - dr hab. Adam Nowak

Awards
The Institute presents the following awards:

 Kamila Duszenki Award
 Stefan Banach Medal 
 Award for outstanding scientific achievements in the field of mathematics
 Kazimierz Kuratowski Prize
 Marek Wacławek Foundation Awards

References

External links

Institutes of the Polish Academy of Sciences
Education in Warsaw
1948 establishments in Poland